Moken is spoken by inhabitants in southern Myanmar and Southern Thailand, who refer to themselves as Moken (people) and Mawken.

Classification
The language is closely related to the Moklen language, and can be mistaken to be similar to Urak Lawoi' but is in actuality distantly related. They are also regarded as "sea people" as the speakers are primarily concentrated within the Andaman Sea.

History
An oral language, Moken is a Malayo-Polynesian language formed after the migration of the Austronesians from Taiwan 5,000–6,000 years ago, resulting in the development of this Austronesian language. While the population consists of 4,000 Moken, only an estimated 1,500 native speakers remain as of 2009, causing the language to be threatened with extinction.

Endangerment
Out of the ethnic population, the main speakers of Moken are the elder generations as its lack of literacy becomes difficult in the transference of the language, however its lack of literacy has also helped conserve the language. Their title of "sea people" alludes to their grand knowledge of the sea, as that was their way of migration, and the traditional lifestyle of remaining within villages has built generations of marine and forest knowledge as well as boating skills. The advantages of their lifestyle were capitalised when the Surin Islands, where a great many Moken reside, experienced a great tsunami in December 2004 as their ancestors have integrated legends of the "seven rollers" and the "laboon" (giant wave).

Geographic distribution
The language of Moken is spoken in Burma and Thailand, and its derived languages are spoken around the Andaman Sea.

Dialects/Varieties

Dung (635 speakers), spoken in Burma
Jait (331 speakers), spoken in Burma
Lebi, L'be (980 speakers), spoken in Burma
Niawi, spoken in Burma
Jadiak, spoken in Thailand

Dung, Jait, Lebi, and Niawi are spoken in Burma, and Jadiak in Thailand. The Burmese varieties have not been adequately investigated.

Sounds/Phonology

The Moken language follows similar to English phonology regarding intonation in sentences. Rising contour intonations occur when saying sentences that end as questions or as exclamations. Falling contour intonations are used within regular sentences. 

When it comes to two words in Moken that are pronounced in sequences; the first word will maintain a level intonation and the second word ends with a rising intonation. 

In terms of syllables, monosyllabic words with have a levelled amount of stress throughout pronunciation; while words composed of a prefixed syllable and a major syllable will have stress placed on the major syllable. In other words, the last syllable will always be stressed and its absence gives clue to word breaks. 

Moken mostly consists of disyllabic words.

References

Bibliography 

 
 
 
 
 
 
 
 

Moklenic languages
Languages of Myanmar
Languages of Thailand